Gigi Reder (born Luigi Schroeder; 25 March 1928 – 8 October 1998) was an Italian actor and voice actor. He was best known for the role of Filini in the Fantozzi film series.

Biography 
Born in Naples in to a German father and a Neapolitan mother, Reder moved to Rome where started his career in radio as host and actor of radio-dramas. He also debuted on stage in "teatro dialettale" and vaudeville, then performed in the stage companies of Peppino De Filippo, Turi Ferro, Giorgio Albertazzi and Mario Scaccia. Reder made his film debut in the early 1950s, but became popular in the 1970s as the sidekick of Paolo Villaggio in some successful comedies, such as the Fantozzi and Fracchia series.

He was an atheist.

Selected filmography

 47 morto che parla (1950)
 Bellezze in bicicletta (1951)
 Una bruna indiavolata! (1951) - Cameriere bar stazione
 Stasera sciopero (1951)
 Licenza premio (1951) - Sergente
 Free Escape (1951)
 Porca miseria (1951)
 Carica eroica (1952) - Cavalry soldier
 Bread, Love and Dreams (1953) - Ricuccio
 Passionate Song (1953) - Un Turista
 Bread, Love and Jealousy (1954) - Ricuccio
 The Gold of Naples (1954) - Don Peppino's friend (segment "Pizze a credito") (uncredited)
 The Belle of Rome (1955) - Luigi
 Wild Love (1956) - Annibale
 Anna of Brooklyn (1958)
 La cento chilometri (1959) - The Superstitious Race Walker
 Il vedovo (1959) - Avv. Girondi
 Ferdinando I, re di Napoli (1959) - The Customs Officer
 Mina... fuori la guardia (1961) - Tenente
 Fra' Manisco cerca guai (1961) - Franceschiello
 Parigi o cara (1962) - Il Portinaio
 Made in Italy (1965) - The Tobacconist (segment "4 'Cittadini, stato e chiesa', episode 1")
 Zingara (1969) - Direttore ristorante
 Giacomo Casanova: Childhood and Adolescence (1969) - Salvatore
 Satiricosissimo (1970) - Innkeeper
 Cerca di capirmi (1970)
 A Pocketful of Chestnuts (1970) - Il cameriere
 Ma che musica maestro (1971) - Benedetto - father of Giulietta
 Little Funny Guy (1973) 
 Fantozzi (1975) - Rag. Filini
 Il secondo tragico Fantozzi (1976) - Rag. Filini
 Il... Belpaese (1977) - Alfredo
 They Call Him Bulldozer (1978) - Curatolo
 Where Are You Going on Holiday? (1978) - Dottor Panunti (segment "Sì buana")
 Riavanti... Marsch! (1979) - Colonel Luigi Placidi
 Café Express (1980) - Antonio Cammarota
 Rag. Arturo De Fanti, bancario precario (1980) - Willy
 Fantozzi contro tutti (1980) - Rag. Filini
 Quando la coppia scoppia (1981) - Pier Giorgio Martini
 L'onorevole con l'amante sotto il letto (1981) - Vescovo
 Fracchia la belva umana (1981) - Madre della Belva Umana
 Vieni avanti cretino (1982) - The Man with a toothache
 Il tifoso, l'arbitro e il calciatore (1982) - Commendator Pecorazzi
 Gian Burrasca (1983) - Headmaster
 Stangata napoletana (1983)
 Fantozzi subisce ancora (1983) - Rag. Filini
 Sfrattato cerca casa equo canone (1983) - Pellecchia
 Champagne in paradiso (1984) - Director
 Mi faccia causa (1984) - Lawyer
 Who Is Afraid Of Dracula? (1985) - Rag. Filini
 Una donna senza nome (1985) - L'allevatore
 Grandi magazzini (1986) - Dott. Kaufmann
 Superfantozzi (1986) - Filini
 Le diaboliche (1987)
 Fantozzi va in pensione (1988) - Rag. Filini
 Fantozzi alla riscossa (1990) - Rag. Filini
 The Great Pumpkin (1993) - Prof. Turati
 Fantozzi in paradiso (1993) - Rag. Filini
 A Dio piacendo (1995) - L'ingegner Camperi
 Fantozzi - Il ritorno (1996) - Rag. Filini (final film role)

References

External links 
 

1928 births
1998 deaths
Male actors from Naples
Italian male film actors
Italian male television actors
Italian male stage actors
Italian male voice actors
Italian male radio actors
20th-century Italian male actors
Italian radio personalities
Italian people of German descent